A mayoral election was held in Bandung on 10 August 2008. The election was the first direct mayoral election for the city.

Three pairs of candidates contested the election, including the incumbent mayor Dada Rosada. Rosada, who was supported by a coalition of parties Golkar, PDI-P, PAN, Demokrat and PPP, won the election in a landslide, securing nearly 65 percent of the total votes.

Results

References

Bandung
Elections in West Java
Mayoral elections in Indonesia
2008 elections in Indonesia